Eupithecia celatisigna is a moth in the family Geometridae. It is found in Angola, Cameroon, the Democratic Republic of Congo, Kenya, South Africa, Tanzania and Uganda.

Subspecies
Eupithecia celatisigna celatisigna
Eupithecia celatisigna tatoptera Prout, 1932 (Kenya)

References

Moths described in 1902
celatisigna
Moths of Africa